Paressonodon is an extinct genus of multituberculate which existed in Colorado during the late Cretaceous period. It contains the species Paressonodon nelsoni.

References

Ptilodontoids
Cretaceous mammals of North America
Fossils of the United States
Hell Creek fauna
Fossil taxa described in 2010
Prehistoric mammal genera